The 2018–19 Butler Bulldogs women's basketball team represents Butler University in the 2018–19 NCAA Division I women's basketball season. The Bulldogs, led by fifth year head coach Kurt Godlevske, play their home games at Hinkle Fieldhouse and were members of the Big East Conference. They finished the season 23–10, 11–7 in Big East play to finish in third place. They lost in the quarterfinals of the Big East women's tournament to Creighton. They received an automatic bid to the WNIT where they defeated Northeastern and Kent State in the first and second rounds before losing to Cincinnati in third round.

Previous season
The Bulldogs finished the season 15–17, 6–12 in Big East play to finish in eighth place. As the No. 8 seed in the Big East tournament, they defeated Providence before losing to Marquette in the quarterfinals.

Roster

Schedule

|-
!colspan=9 style=| Exhibition

|-
!colspan=9 style=| Non-conference regular season

|-
!colspan=9 style=| Big East regular season

|-
!colspan=9 style=|Big East Women's Tournament

|-
!colspan=9 style=|WNIT

Rankings
2018–19 NCAA Division I women's basketball rankings

See also
2018–19 Butler Bulldogs men's basketball team

References

Butler
Butler Bulldogs women's basketball seasons
Butler Bulldogs women's basketball
Butler Bulldogs women's basketball
Butler